Attila Demény (2 March 1955 – 11 May 2021) was a Romanian composer and theatre director.

Born into an ethnic Hungarian family in Cluj, his parents were Dezső, a psychologist, and Piroska, a folk singer. He died in his native city.

References

External Links
 

1955 births
2021 deaths
Romanian composers
Romanian theatre directors
Romanian people of Hungarian descent
Gheorghe Dima Music Academy alumni
People from Cluj-Napoca